Xong can refer to:

Xong language
Limbu people